Clarence is a 1922 American silent comedy drama, based on the 1919 play by Booth Tarkington, produced by Famous Players-Lasky and distributed through Paramount Pictures. It was directed by William C. deMille and starred Wallace Reid in his penultimate screen appearance.

In E.J. Fleming's 2007 biography of Wallace Reid, it is stated that many in Reid's neighborhood, including Rudolph Valentino, remembered that Reid kept the neighborhood awake playing his saxophone. It is not stated whether Reid was honing his skills for this film or just enjoying some leisure.

The film is now considered a lost film.

Cast
Wallace Reid as Clarence Smith
Agnes Ayres as Violet Pinney
May McAvoy as Cora Wheeler
Kathlyn Williams as Mrs. Wheeler
Edward Martindel as Mr. Wheeler
Robert Agnew as Bobby Wheeler
Adolphe Menjou as Hubert Stem
Bertram Johns as Dinwiddie
Dorothy Gordon as Della
Mayme Kelso as Mrs. Martin

Plot
The father of a quirky family, the Wheelers, hires an ex-soldier, Clarence (Reid), as a handyman. Clarence falls for the family's governess, Violet (Ayres).

Mrs. Wheeler (Williams) suspects that Violet and her husband (Martindel) are carrying on, and Mrs. Wheeler begins to develop an attraction to Clarence. Hubert Stem (Menjou), Mr. Wheeler's avaricious private secretary, one day shows Mr. Wheeler an article about Charles Short, an army deserter, and insists that Clarence is in actuality Charles Short.

See also
List of lost films
Wallace Reid filmography

References

External links

Wallace Reid in portrait still as Clarence
Portraits and text concerning Clarence

1922 films
1922 comedy-drama films
American silent feature films
Famous Players-Lasky films
American films based on plays
Films based on works by Booth Tarkington
Films directed by William C. deMille
Lost American films
Paramount Pictures films
American black-and-white films
1922 lost films
Lost comedy-drama films
1920s American films
Silent American comedy-drama films
1920s English-language films